Bezirk Weiz is a district of the state of Styria in Austria. Since the 2015 Styria municipal structural reform, it consists of the following municipalities:

 Albersdorf-Prebuch
 Anger
 Birkfeld
 Fischbach
 Fladnitz an der Teichalm
 Floing
 Gasen
 Gersdorf an der Feistritz
 Gleisdorf
 Gutenberg-Stenzengreith
 Hofstätten an der Raab
 Ilztal
 Ludersdorf-Wilfersdorf
 Markt Hartmannsdorf
 Miesenbach bei Birkfeld
 Mitterdorf an der Raab
 Mortantsch
 Naas
 Passail
 Pischelsdorf am Kulm
 Puch bei Weiz
 Ratten
 Rettenegg
 Sankt Kathrein am Hauenstein
 Sankt Kathrein am Offenegg
 Sankt Margarethen an der Raab
 Sankt Ruprecht an der Raab
 Sinabelkirchen
 Strallegg
 Thannhausen
 Weiz

Municipalities before 2015
Suburbs, hamlets and other subdivisions of a municipality are indicated in small characters.
 Albersdorf-Prebuch
Albersdorf, Kalch, Postelgraben, Prebuch, Wollsdorferegg
 Anger
 Arzberg
 Baierdorf bei Anger
Baierdorf-Dorf, Baierdorf-Umgebung, Fresen
 Birkfeld
 Etzersdorf-Rollsdorf
Etzersdorf, Lohngraben, Rollsdorf
 Feistritz bei Anger
Oberfeistritz, Viertelfeistritz
 Fischbach
Falkenstein, Völlegg
 Fladnitz an der Teichalm
Fladnitzberg, Schrems bei Frohnleiten, Fladnitz-Tober, Teichalm
 Floing
Lebing, Unterfeistritz
 Gasen
Amassegg, Mitterbach, Sonnleitberg
 Gersdorf an der Feistritz
Gschmaier, Hartensdorf
 Gleisdorf
 Gschaid bei Birkfeld
 Gutenberg an der Raabklamm
Garrach, Kleinsemmering
 Haslau bei Birkfeld
 Hirnsdorf
 Hofstätten an der Raab
Pirching an der Raab, Wetzawinkel, Wünschendorf
 Hohenau an der Raab
Auen, Haufenreith, Krammersdorf
 Ilztal
Großpesendorf, Neudorf, Nitschaberg, Prebensdorf, Wolfgruben bei Gleisdorf
 Koglhof
Aschau, Rabendorf, Rossegg, Sallegg
 Krottendorf
Büchl, Farcha, Nöstl, Preding bei Weiz, Regerstätten
 Kulm bei Weiz
Kulming, Rohrbach am Kulm
 Labuch
Urscha
 Laßnitzthal
 Ludersdorf-Wilfersdorf
Flöcking, Ludersdorf, Pircha, Wilfersdorf
 Markt Hartmannsdorf
Bärnbach, Reith bei Hartmannsdorf, Oed, Pöllau bei Gleisdorf
 Miesenbach bei Birkfeld
Berg-und Hinterleitenviertel, Dorfviertel
 Mitterdorf an der Raab
Dörfl an der Raab, Hohenkogl, Oberdorf, Obergreith, Pichl an der Raab, Untergreith
 Mortantsch
Göttelsberg, Hafning, Haselbach bei Weiz, Leska, Steinberg bei Weiz
 Naas
Affental, Birchbaum, Dürntal, Gschaid bei Weiz, Naintsch, Heilbrunn, Offenegg
 Neudorf bei Passail
Amstein, Oberneudorf, Unterneudorf
 Nitscha
Arnwiesen, Gamling, Kaltenbrunn, Nitscha KG
 Oberrettenbach
Rothgmos
 Passail
Passail, Hintertober, Tober
 Pischelsdorf in der Steiermark
Pischelsdorf in der Steiermark, Kleinpesendorf, Romatschachen, Schachen am Römerbach
 Preßguts
Schirnitz
 Puch bei Weiz
Elz, Harl, Höfling, Klettendorf, Perndorf
 Ratten
Grubbauer, Kirchenviertel
 Reichendorf
 Rettenegg
Feistritzwald, Inneres Kaltenegg
 Sankt Kathrein am Hauenstein
Landau
 Sankt Kathrein am Offenegg
Sankt Kathrein am Offenegg I. Viertel, Sankt Kathrein am Offenegg II. Viertel
 Sankt Margarethen an der Raab
Entschendorf bei Gleisdorf, Goggitsch, Kroisbach an der Raab, Sulz bei Gleisdorf, Takern I, Takern II, Zöbing an der Raab
 Sankt Ruprecht an der Raab
Fünfing bei Sankt Ruprecht an der Raab, Grub bei Sankt Ruprecht an der Raab, Wolfgruben b. Sankt Ruprecht a.d. Raab
 Sinabelkirchen
Egelsdorf, Frösau, Fünfing bei Gleisdorf, Gnies, Nagl, Obergroßau, Untergroßau, Unterrettenbach
 Stenzengreith
Plenzengreith, Stockheim
 Strallegg
Außeregg, Feistritz, Pacher
 Thannhausen
Alterilz, Grub, Landscha bei Weiz, Oberdorf bei Thannhausen, Oberfladnitz-Thannhausen, Peesen, Ponigl, Raas, Trennstein
 Ungerdorf
 Unterfladnitz
Arndorf bei Sankt Ruprecht an der Raab, Dietmannsdorf, Kühwiesen, Neudorf bei Sankt Ruprecht an der Raab, Wollsdorf
 Waisenegg
Piregg
 Weiz

References

 
Districts of Styria